Tadashi Murakami (born 7 October 1912, date of death unknown) was a Japanese hurdler. He competed in the men's 110 metres hurdles at the 1936 Summer Olympics.

References

External links
 

1912 births
Year of death missing
Athletes (track and field) at the 1936 Summer Olympics
Japanese male hurdlers
Olympic athletes of Japan
Place of birth missing